Sperling is a German and Jewish surname, meaning "sparrow" in English. Notable people with the surname include: 

 Alexander Sperling (1890–1973), German gymnast
 Andrea Sperling, American film producer
 Bert Sperling (born 1950), American author
 Bodo Sperling (born 1952), German artist
 Daniel Sperling (born 1951), American professor
 Dee Dee Sperling, musical entertainer
 Eduard Sperling (1902–1985), German wrestler
 Edward Sperling (1889–1946), official in the British Mandate of Palestine, and Zionist
 Elliot Sperling (1951–2017), American associate professor
 Fritz Sperling (born 1945), Austrian bobsledder
 Gene Sperling (born 1958), American economist and attorney
 George Sperling (born 1934), American cognitive psychologist
 Gerhard Sperling (born 1937), East German race walker
  (1800s-1900s), German  wrestler
 Hilde Krahwinkel Sperling (1908–1981), German tennis player
 Jack Sperling (1922–2004), American musician
 James Sperling, governor of the Bank of England
 Jody Sperling, American dancer
 Johann Sperling (1603–1658), German physician, zoologist, physicist, deacon, and rektor
 John Sperling (1921–2014), American billionaire and University of Phoenix founder
 Leon Sperling (1900–1941), Polish footballer
 Lilian Sperling, British nanny
 Louise Sperling (born 1952), US humanitarian scientist, seed security/conflict zones
 Marcos Von Sperling, Brazilian professor
  (1873–1946), Dutch captain and diver, who rescued 15 shipwrecked victims from the SS Berlin in 1907
 Matthew Sperling, American Magic: The Gathering player
 Max Sperling (1905–1984), German officer
 Milton Sperling (1912–1988), producer and screenwriter
 Norman Sperling (born 1947), American telescope designer
  (born 1913)
 Peter Sperling (born 1960), founder of the Apollo Group
 Rolf Sperling (born 1940), German diver
 Rowland Sperling (1874–1965), British diplomat
 Sacha Sperling (born 1990), French novelist and screenwriter
 Ted Sperling, musical director
 Vibeke Sperling, (1945–2017), Danish journalist
 Wolfram Sperling (born 1952), German swimmer

Places
 Sperling, Manitoba, Canada

See also
 Sperl
 Sperlyng

German-language surnames
Jewish surnames
Surnames from nicknames